Qualifying for the 2007 UEFA European Under-21 Championship began in May 2006.

Netherlands qualify as hosts and are exempt from qualifying.  Of UEFA's 52 member countries, only the Faroe Islands chose not to compete.  That left 50 nations attempting to qualify for the 7 remaining spots at the finals.

The competition's structure is as follows:
The 16 lowest ranked nations played-off (on a home-and-away basis) before the qualifying group stage, to eliminate 8 teams.
 The remaining 42 teams formed 14 three-team groups, each team playing one home match and one away match.
 The 14 group winners played-off (on a home-and-away basis) to decide the seven qualifying nations.

Preliminary round

Teams went into the preliminary round already knowing who they would face should they get through.

|}

Qualifying groups

Group  1

Group  2

Group  3

Group  4

Group  5

Group 6

Group 7

Group 8

Group 9

Group 10

Group 11

Group 12

Group 13

Group 14

Play-offs

The 14 group winners were paired up. The winners over two legs qualified for the finals. The draw took place in Nyon, Switzerland on 8 September 2006.

|}

External links
 Draw and Fixtures at uefa.com

Qualification
Qual
UEFA European Under-21 Championship qualification